Ai Weiwei: The Fake Case is a 2013 documentary film about Chinese artist and activist Ai Weiwei, directed by Danish filmmaker Andreas Johnsen. The film won Best 2014 Documentary in Danish Film Critics Association's 67th Bodil Awards, played in the official selection of 2014 Hot Docs Canadian International Documentary Festival in Toronto and International Documentary Film Festival Amsterdam.

The documentary explores Ai Weiwei's battle against the fake tax case thrust on him by the Chinese government in effort of political suppression and the consequences that the 81-day detention had on his art, politics and personal life. It was pitched at the 2012 MeetMarket as part of the Sheffield Doc/Fest.

Description 

Ai Weiwei The Fake Case opens with scenes of Ai Weiwei being released from his 81-day detention spent in solitary confinement, and he is subsequently put on house arrest following gigantic and inexplicable charges of tax evasion, a case film's title references. He suffers from a sleeping disorder and memory loss, 18 cameras are monitoring his studio and home, police agents follow his every move, and heavy restrictions from the Kafkaesque Chinese authorities weigh him down. Ai Weiwei is visibly shaken, but during his year on probation he steadily finds new ways to provoke and challenge the mighty authoritarian regime in his fight for human rights and free expression.

The film picks up where Alison Klayman's Ai Weiwei: Never Sorry left off, but Ai Weiwei The Fake Case is more explicitly political. The documentary also features creation of S.A.C.R.E.D., an artwork featuring sculpture dioramas of Ai's time in prison, which premiered during the 2013 Venice Biennale.

Critical reception
On review aggregator Rotten Tomatoes, the film holds an approval rating of 93% based on 27 reviews, with an average rating of 7.14/10. On Metacritic, the film has a weighted average score of 73 out of 100, based on 13 critics, indicating "generally favorable reviews".

References

External links 

Official International Film Circuit (U.S. distributor) site for the film

 
 

2013 films
Ai Weiwei
2013 documentary films
Danish documentary films
Documentary films about China
Documentary films about human rights
Documentary films about visual artists
Documentary films about law
2010s legal films
Best Documentary Bodil Award winners